"Down That Road Tonight" is a song written by Jeff Hanna, Josh Leo and Wendy Waldman, and recorded by American country music group Nitty Gritty Dirt Band. It was released on December 24, 1988 as the third single from the album Workin' Band, and reached No. 6 on the Billboard Hot Country Songs chart.

Chart performance

Year-end charts

References

1989 singles
Nitty Gritty Dirt Band songs
Songs written by Josh Leo
Song recordings produced by Josh Leo
Warner Records singles
Songs written by Jeff Hanna
Songs written by Wendy Waldman
1988 songs